Clarence Town is a town in the Bahamas. It is located on Long Island.
Clarence Town is the capital of Long Island and has a population of 86 people as of 2010. It has a marina, two restaurants as well as the government dock where the mail boat docks on a weekly basis. It also has a small grocery store, gas station and a small pub as well as a police station, post office and community centre. There are two churches in Clarence Town, both designed by John Hawes, of similar appearance with their twin towers. One is Anglican/Episcopal, named St. Paul's Anglican Church. The other is Roman Catholic, named St. Peter and Paul.

Transportation
The town and area are served by nearby Deadman's Cay Airport.

References

External links
Long Island Bahamas' Official Website

Populated places in the Bahamas
Long Island, Bahamas